National Secondary Route 253, or just Route 253 (or ) is a National Road Route of Costa Rica, located in the Guanacaste province.

Description
In Guanacaste province the route covers Liberia canton (Nacascolo district), Carrillo canton (Palmira district).

References

Highways in Costa Rica